Demise is a legal term for a transfer of an estate, especially by lease.

Demise may also refer to:
 Death, the permanent cessation of all biological functions that sustain a particular living organism
 A demise charter is a form of bareboat charter in which the charter period may last for many years

Technology 
 Demise of a satellite, the complete breakup and burnup of an artificial satellite upon entry into a planetary atmosphere

Literature and the arts 
 Demise (Wild Cards), a fictional character from the Wild Cards book series
 Demise (The Legend of Zelda), the main villain in The Legend of Zelda: Skyward Sword
 Demise: Rise of the Ku'tan, a 1999 computer role-playing game
 The Demise, an Irish punk rock band 
 "The Demise", a song by Hawkwind from their 1985 album The Chronicle of the Black Sword
 Demise (Missing Foundation album), 1989
 Demise, a 1991 album by Orlík
 Demise (Nachtmystium album), 2006